Betulia is a town and municipality in the Colombian department of Antioquia. Part of the subregion of Southwestern Antioquia.

Climate
Betulia has a relatively cool tropical rainforest climate (Af) due to altitude with heavy rainfall year-round.

References

And this is

Municipalities of Antioquia Department